Anderson Lake is a lake located  on Vancouver Island at the expansion of Dove Creek northwest of the city of Courtenay.

References

Comox Valley
Lakes of Vancouver Island
Comox Land District